Johannes Matzen (born 13 February 1925) is a German former footballer.

Matzen scored 76 goals in the East German top-flight in 209 matches.

Matzen was parted of the East German team in their first ever international in September 1952 against Poland. He won another cap in 1954.

External links

References 

1925 births
Possibly living people
German footballers
East German footballers
East Germany international footballers
Dynamo Dresden players
Berliner FC Dynamo players
DDR-Oberliga players
Association football forwards